Azrag (also known as Azrak, Azrak-e Yek, Azraq, and Azraq Hashish) is a village in Jahad Rural District, Hamidiyeh District, Ahvaz County, Khuzestan Province, Iran. At the 2006 census, its population was 274, in 43 families.

References 

Populated places in Ahvaz County